The Sex Pistols were an English punk rock band.

Sex Pistols may also refer to:

 Sex Pistols (box set), a 2002 CD collection by the band
 Love Pistols, a Japanese yaoi manga series originally titled Sex Pistols